Axel Noack (born 23 September 1961 in Görlitz) is a German former race walker. On 21 June 1987 in Chemnitz he achieved a new world best time in 20 km walk with 1'19:12 hours.

International competitions

References

1961 births
Living people
East German male racewalkers
German male racewalkers
Olympic athletes of East Germany
Athletes (track and field) at the 1988 Summer Olympics
Olympic athletes of Germany
Athletes (track and field) at the 1992 Summer Olympics
Athletes (track and field) at the 1996 Summer Olympics
World Athletics Championships athletes for East Germany
World Athletics Championships athletes for Germany
World record setters in athletics (track and field)
People from Görlitz
Sportspeople from Saxony